Elmar Reimann (2 January 1893 – 21 April 1963) was an Estonian long-distance runner. He competed in the marathon for the Russian Empire at the 1912 Summer Olympics and for Estonia at the 1924 Summer Olympics.

References

External links
 

1893 births
1963 deaths
Sportspeople from Tartu
People from the Governorate of Livonia
Athletes (track and field) at the 1912 Summer Olympics
Athletes (track and field) at the 1924 Summer Olympics
Estonian male long-distance runners
Russian male long-distance runners
Estonian male marathon runners
Russian male marathon runners
Olympic athletes of Estonia
Olympic competitors for the Russian Empire